Gu'an County is a county of Hebei province, China, bordering Beijing to the north. It is under the jurisdiction of Langfang City, with direct access to central Beijing via both G45 Daqing–Guangzhou Expressway and China National Highway 106.

Administrative divisions
The county administers five towns and four townships.

Towns:
Gu'an Town, Gongcun, Liuquan, Niutuo, Mazhuang

Townships:
Dongwan Township, Pengcun Township, Qugou Township, Lirangdian Township

Climate

References

External links

 
Langfang
County-level divisions of Hebei